Nema Kunku is a village in the Kanifing Local Government Area, Gambia. As of the 2013 census, Nema Kunku had a population of 36,134.

Nema Kunku is located near Serekunda, with most of tourism to the area being sparked by Serekunda, and the capital, Banjul. Some individuals have tooken advantage of the tourism, by businesses labled with names related to such places.

See Also 
 Serekunda
 Kanifing
 Banjul
 Abuko

Populated places in the Gambia